Hills Meadow is a park in Reading, Berkshire, England, located next to the River Thames. It stretches along the north (Caversham) side of the river, to the east of Reading Bridge. It is linked to the south (Reading) bank by a footpath, locally known as The Clappers that crosses View Island and the weir at Caversham Lock.

Hills Meadow form part of a series of riverside open spaces, managed by Reading Borough Council, that stretch along one or other side of the River Thames throughout its passage through Reading. From west to east these are Thameside Promenade, Caversham Court, Christchurch Meadows, Hills Meadow, View Island and King's Meadow. Hills Meadow is connected to Christchurch Meadows by a pedestrian arch under Reading Bridge.

The park offers walkways alongside a tree-lined backwater of the Thames, together with a BMX track, a skateboarding ramp and car parking. Hills Meadow is the traditional venue for fairs and circuses visiting the town.

References

External links 

 Page on Hills Meadow from Reading Borough Council

Parks and open spaces in Reading, Berkshire
Water-meadows
Meadows in Berkshire